Federal Route 126, or Jalan Cerul and Jalan Jerangau-Jabor (Penghantar 1), is a federal road in Terengganu, Malaysia. The Kilometre Zero of the Federal Route 126 starts at Kampung Chenih.

Features
At most sections, the Federal Route 126 was built under the JKR R5 road standard, allowing maximum speed limit of up to 90 km/h.

List of junctions and towns

References

Malaysian Federal Roads